Temple Beth-El is a historic Jewish synagogue at 301 E. Thirteenth Street in Anniston, Alabama.  It was built in 1891 in the Romanesque Revival style. It was added to the National Register of Historic Places in 1985.

References

Jews and Judaism in Appalachia
Reform synagogues in Alabama
Properties of religious function on the National Register of Historic Places in Alabama
National Register of Historic Places in Calhoun County, Alabama
Romanesque Revival architecture in Alabama
Synagogues completed in 1891
Buildings and structures in Anniston, Alabama
Synagogues on the National Register of Historic Places